Nicholas James McDonald (born June 27, 1987) is a former American football center. He was signed as an undrafted free agent by the Green Bay Packers in 2010. In that year, he won Super Bowl XLV with the team against the Pittsburgh Steelers. McDonald played college football at Grand Valley State University.

Professional career

Green Bay Packers
After going the 2010 NFL Draft, McDonald signed with the Green Bay Packers on April 30, 2010.

McDonald was on the roster when the Packers won Super Bowl XLV over the Pittsburgh Steelers.

He was waived by the Packers on September 3, 2011.

New England Patriots
McDonald was signed to the New England Patriots' practice squad on September 4, 2011. He was released from the squad on September 15, but was re-signed the following day. On December 3, 2011, he was promoted to the active roster to replace the released Taylor Price. McDonald was part of the Patriots postseason team for Super Bowl XLVI but his hopes for a second straight championship came short when the Patriots lost the game to the New York Giants. On July 31, 2013, McDonald was waived by the New England Patriots.

San Diego Chargers
On January 16, 2014, McDonald signed a reserves/futures contract with the San Diego Chargers. On July 21, 2014, he was released.

Cleveland Browns
On July 22, 2014, McDonald was claimed by the Cleveland Browns. On May 27, 2015, he was released by the Browns.

References

External links
Green Bay Packers bio
San Diego Chargers bio

1987 births
Living people
American football offensive guards
Cleveland Browns players
Grand Valley State Lakers football players
Green Bay Packers players
New England Patriots players
San Diego Chargers players
Sportspeople from Salinas, California
Players of American football from California